Björn Dirk Krapohl (born 26 January 1965, Kettiwg, Germany) is a German surgeon, specializing in plastic surgery and hand surgery at the University of Lübeck and the Charité in Berlin. He is known for his work in the fields of reconstructive microsurgery, hand surgery, and breast surgery.

Biography 
Krapohl studied human medicine at the universities of Giessen, Aachen, Paris, London (Canada), Toronto (Canada), Philadelphia and Cologne. In 1995 he was promoted to doctor of medicine at the University of Cologne and also finished the United States Medical Licensing Examination (ECFMG licence), Philadelphia, Pennsylvania, U.S. He hold several positions until 2003 including medicine at The Cleveland Clinic Foundation in Cleveland, Ohio U.S. and at the Section of Telerobotics, Jet Propulsion Laboratory, NASA in Pasadena, California, U.S. He obtained his licensure for plastic surgery in 2003 and was habilitated in the discipline of plastic surgery at the University of Lübeck in the same year. He also obtained a venia docendi at the University of Vienna. In 2005 he obtained an additional title for hand surgery.

Krapohl was named head of the Department of Plastic Surgery and Hand Surgery at the Armed Forces Hospital (Bundwehrkrankenhaus) Berlin and consulting physician at the Center of Musculoskeletal Surgery at the Charité, University Medicine. He was named lecturer of the Charité at the Armed Forces Hospital Berlin and at the lecturer-association of the Charité in 2007.  The University of Lübeck appointed Krapohl as associate professor in 2008. He was a guest lecturer at the Medical faculty of the Military Academy of Hanoi, Vietnam from 2010 to 2011 and a guest lecturer at the Medical High School of Tiflis in 2012. Krapohl was named head of the Section of Plastic Surgery at the Center of Musculoskeletal Surgery at the Charité, University Medicine, Berlin in 2014. In 2015 he became chief physician for plastic and aesthetic surgery, reconstructive microsurgery and hand surgery at the Marien-Hospital Berlin as well as consultant physician for reconstructive surgery and child surgery and also consultant surgery for breast reconstruction at the Charité. In 2018 he was recruited by the Carl-Thiem-Klinikum Cottbus (Germany) to establish Plastic Surgery at this hospital and to build up a Center for Reconstructive Surgery in affiliation with Department of Maxillofacial Surgery.

Scientific contribution 
Since the beginning of his university career, Krapohl has focused on microsurgery of peripheral nerves and vessels. While working at the Cleveland Clinic Krapohl was involved in the development of animal models for transplantation of extremities and organs. Furthermore, he established animal models for microvascular thrombosis and thrombolysis. In 1997 the NASA Jet Propulsion Laboratory recruited Krapohl for the development of a prototype robot for microsurgical procedures in collaboration with the NASA engineers. Later on he continued his interest in microsurgery and especially in microsurgical replantation of extremities.  When he began his work at the Military Hospital in Berlin he gradually focused on surgery of the breast. He prove that in military guards just the impact of the carbine to the chest while exercising can induce unilateral breast growth. Thereby he verified a new etiology of male gynecomastia due to mechanical stimulation. His findings were integrated into the guidelines of gynecomastia.

Academic memberships 
 Since 2004: German society of plastic, reconstructive and aesthetic surgeons
 Since 2004: Austrian society of hand surgery
 Since 2008: German Society for Plastic and Reconstruction Surgery, head of section of aesthetic surgery

Honors and awards 
 Price of the Ohio Valley Society for Plastic Surgeons, Indianapolis, USA (1997)

Publications

External links 
 St. Marienkrankenhaus Berlin: Plastische Chirurgie und Handchirurgie
 Charité Centrum für muskulo-skeletale Chirurgie: Plastische Chirurgie

References

German plastic surgeons
1965 births
Living people